Nirvana is a debut extended play (EP) by English singer Sam Smith. It was released in the United Kingdom as a digital download on 4 October 2013. The EP includes an acoustic version of Disclosure's "Latch". "Safe with Me" peaked at number 86 and "Nirvana" peaked at number 82 on the UK Singles Chart in October 2013.

Background
The EP contains four tracks. The first, titled "Safe with Me", is produced by Two Inch Punch and premiered on MistaJam's BBC Radio 1Xtra show on 24 July 2013. The second song on the EP is titled "Nirvana" and is produced by Craze & Hoax and Jonathan Creek. The EP also includes Smith's acoustic solo version of "Latch" and a live version of "I've Told You Now". In an interview with BBC Radio 1, they said that the songs on the EP were "experimental" and would not appear on their album In the Lonely Hour.

Track listing

Charts

Release history

References

2013 debut EPs
Sam Smith (singer) EPs
Albums produced by Jimmy Napes
Capitol Records EPs
PMR Records EPs